Albert McCoy Farm is a historic home, farm, and national historic district located near Huntersville, Mecklenburg County, North Carolina. The district encompasses two contributing buildings, one contributing site, and five contributing structures in rural Mecklenburg County.  The farmhouse was built about 1886, and is a two-story, timber frame, side-gable-and-wing dwelling with vernacular Queen Anne style design elements.  It has a shallow cross gable roof, weatherboard siding, and three brick chimneys. It features a pedimented gable front porch. Other contributing resources include an arbor, a log corn crib, a wellhouse, a smokehouse, a privy, pumphouse, and the agricultural landscape.

It was added to the National Register of Historic Places in 2000.

References

Farms on the National Register of Historic Places in North Carolina
Houses on the National Register of Historic Places in North Carolina
Historic districts on the National Register of Historic Places in North Carolina
Queen Anne architecture in North Carolina
Houses completed in 1886
Houses in Mecklenburg County, North Carolina
National Register of Historic Places in Mecklenburg County, North Carolina